Robert Martins (born in Penryn, Cornwall on 26 February 1822; died 1904) was a British draughts player who was World Checkers/Draughts Champion from 1859 to 1864. Although of English/Cornish origin he spent much of his later life in Scotland. He was a noted rival of James Wyllie. "Chambers's Journal" physically described him as tall, pale-faced, and long-headed. While in personality they considered him courteous and cautious in expressing opinions on points of the game.

References 

British draughts players
Players of English draughts
People from Penryn, Cornwall
1822 births
1904 deaths